The 2018–19 Four Hills Tournament, part of the 2018–19 FIS Ski Jumping World Cup, took place at the four traditional venues of Oberstdorf, Garmisch-Partenkirchen, Innsbruck and Bischofshofen, located in Germany and Austria, between 29 December 2018 and 6 January 2019.

Ryoyu Kobayashi became the second Japanese ski jumper to win the overall tournament title, following Kazuyoshi Funaki in 1997–98. Kobayashi also became the third ski jumper in history to win all four events, after Sven Hannawald in 2001–02 and Kamil Stoch in 2017–18.

Results

Oberstdorf
 HS 137 Schattenbergschanze, Germany
30 December 2018

Garmisch-Partenkirchen
 HS 142 Große Olympiaschanze, Germany
1 January 2019

Innsbruck
 HS 130 Bergiselschanze, Austria
 4 January 2019

Bischofshofen
 HS 142 Paul-Ausserleitner-Schanze, Austria
 6 January 2019

Overall standings

The final standings after all four events:

References

External links 
 

2018-19
2018 in ski jumping
2019 in ski jumping
2018 in German sport
2019 in German sport
2019 in Austrian sport